Union Sportive de Matoury is a French Guianese football club playing at the top level. It is based in Matoury.  Their home stadium is Stade Municipal.

Former players

  Wilfried Galimo

Achievements
 French Guiana Championnat National: 7
 2002–03, 2005–06, 2010–11, 2011–12, 2013–14, 2015–16, 2016-17.

 Coupe de Guyane: 6
 2004–05, 2010–11, 2011–12, 2012–13, 2014–15, 2015–16.

 Coupe des Guyanes de football: 1
 2011.

The club in the French football structure
 Coupe de France: 6 appearances
1998–99, 2001–02, 2003–04, 2005–06, 2013–14, 2014–15
 Tie won:
2014–15 CMS Oissel 1–1 US Mataury (aet, 2–4 pens) (round 7)

References

US de Matoury
Football clubs in French Guiana